The Sopwith Bee was a small biplane built in 1916 as a personal aircraft for Harry Hawker, Sopwith's chief test pilot.

History
The Bee was a single-bay biplane powered by a  Gnome Omega rotary engine, intended for use by Hawker as a runabout and for aerobatics.  As with contemporary Sopwith fighter aircraft, great effort was made to concentrate the heaviest components as close to the aircraft's centre of gravity in order to optimise manoeverability: this necessitated a large semi-circular cutout in the trailing edge of the upper wing to accommodate the pilot. Lateral control was achieved by wing warping.

The Bee was subsequently fitted with a single synchronised Vickers .303 machine gun, possibly with a view to meeting the Admiralty's requirement for a small scout aircraft capable of operating from torpedo-boat destroyers, but this came to nothing and no further development of the type was carried out.

The aircraft was sometimes referred to as the Tadpole.

Specifications

References

Citations

Bibliography
 Mason, Francis K. The British Fighter Since 1912. London: Putnam, 1992. 

1910s British fighter aircraft
1910s British experimental aircraft
Biplanes
Bee
Single-engined tractor aircraft
Aircraft first flown in 1916
Rotary-engined aircraft